Arkadia Emilie Björkstén (July 26, 1823 – January 15, 1896) was a 19th-century Finnish poet, often writing under the pen name e ***. She published four well-received books of poetry between 1864 and 1886. Her work was deeply influenced by the poet Johan Ludvig Runeberg, with whom she had a long romantic affair beginning when she was a teenager.

Early life 
Emilie Björkstén was born in 1823 in Kangasniemi, a town in central Finland. After being orphaned at a young age, she began to move from place to place and stay with different relatives around the country.

Relationship with Johan Ludvig Runeberg 

While living in Porvoo at age 15, Björkstén met the Finnish national poet Johan Ludvig Runeberg, who was nearly 20 years her senior. The two began a romantic relationship, and the successful older poet also served as a literary inspiration and mentor to Björkstén. The height of their emotional affair was between 1846 and 1849, but they remained linked throughout their lives.

While their relationship did cause a stir, it was tempered by Johan's wife Fredrika Runeberg's reaction, which was to accept the affair and befriend Björkstén. A poet herself, Fredrika also became a mentor to the young writer, becoming the first person to read her poetry. The two women's work went on to contain similar symbolic elements, and they also shared a common aim of improving women's status in Finland.

Björkstén continued to move from one relative's house to another throughout her adult life, but she stayed in touch with the Runebergs, and when Johan became paralyzed in 1863 she returned to help care for him. Like Fredrika, Emilie is said to have put up with an "astonishing amount of bad behavior" from Johan over the course of their relationship.

Writing 
Björkstén published several books of poetry, including her well-received debut Sandperlor (1864); Drottningar (1867), which was based on the stories of various famous women; and the largely religious collection De sista (1886). After Johan Runeberg died in 1877, she dedicated the poetry collection Ännu en gång, published later that year, to his widow, "with humility and respect."

Björkstén herself never married, nor did she ever settle in one place permanently or work a steady job. In addition to her poetry, she published a memoir, Några Minnen, in 1871. She also wrote stories for children and worked as a translator from English.

Her writing was usually published under the pen name e *** , although contemporary readers would have likely understood her identity regardless.

Death and legacy 
Björkstén died in 1896. Her letters with the Runebergs and excerpts from her diaries were published posthumously in the 20th century, with her letters with Johan in particular causing a stir when they were first published in 1940.

In 1939, an early Finnish costume film directed by Toivo Särkkä,  ("The King of Poets and the Bird of Passage"), depicted the love story between Runeberg and Björkstén, and it became a massive box-office success.

Selected works

Poetry 

 Sandperlor (1864)
 Drottningar (1867)
 Mosaiker (anthology, editor and contributor, 1874)
 Ännu en gång (1877)
 De sista (1886)

Memoir 

 Några Minnen (1871)

References 

1823 births
1896 deaths
People from Kangasniemi
Finnish women poets
Pseudonymous women writers
19th-century pseudonymous writers